Armada is the third studio album by the Norwegian black metal band Keep of Kalessin. The album was originally released under Tabu Records, however a 2 vinyl set of the album was released on Back On Black. The release features the return of drummer Vyl, and new bassist Wizziac and vocalist Thebon.

Track listing

Notes 
  Music videos for the songs Crown of the Kings and Into the Fire were made.
  The outro is not featured on the actual album, but was made download able from the official forum here .
 All Songs Written By Obsidian C. (music) and Torsten Parelius (lyrics).

Personnel

Keep of Kalessin
 Torbjørn "Thebon" Schei - lead vocals
 Arnt "Obsidian C." Ove Grønbech - guitars, keyboards, synths
 Robin "Wizziac" Isaksen - bass
 Vegar "Vyl" Larsen - drums

Additional personnel
 Attila (from Mayhem): Additional Vocals
 Haakon Marius Petterson: Additional Keyboards

References

2006 albums
Keep of Kalessin albums